Melitara is a genus of snout moths in the subfamily Phycitinae. It was described by Francis Walker in 1863. Some sources list it as a synonym of Zophodia, while others retain it as a valid genus.

Species
 Melitara apicigrammella Blanchard & Knudson, 1985
 Melitara dentata (Grote, 1876) – North American cactus moth
 Melitara doddalis Dyar, 1925
 Melitara junctolineella (Hulst, 1900)
 Melitara prodenialis Walker, 1863
 Melitara subumbrella (Dyar, 1925)
 Melitara texana Neunzig, 1997

References

Phycitini
Pyralidae genera